Historic Central Islip Recreation Center Building, located on 555 Clayton Street in Central Islip, New York, was constructed in the late 19th century as part of the Central Islip State Hospital First Colony.

See also
Central Islip State Hospital Powerplant.

References

External links
Town of Islip Department of Parks, Recreation and Cultural Affairs

Islip (town), New York